Brooke Crain (born April 29, 1993) is an American BMX racing cyclist. Born in Visalia, California she was selected to represent the United States at the 2012 Summer Olympics in the women's BMX event. On August 8, 2012 during her first run in the seeding event, Crain fell after losing control and was placed 16th and last in the seedings. She competed again at the 2016 Olympics and finished in fourth place.

References

External links
 
 
 
 
 

1993 births
Living people
BMX riders
American female cyclists
Olympic cyclists of the United States
Cyclists at the 2012 Summer Olympics
Cyclists at the 2016 Summer Olympics
People from Visalia, California
21st-century American women